Hellak (also Romanized as Helak) is a village in Famur Rural District, Jereh and Baladeh District, Kazerun County, Fars Province, Iran. At the 2006 census, its population was 937, in 164 families.

References 

Populated places in Kazerun County